Yves Manglou (born 20 August 1943 in Bras-Panon, Réunion) is a Réunionese writer who writes in both French and Réunion Creole.

Biography
Yves Manglou grew up on the French island of Réunion at a time when traditional storytelling was still very popular. Réunion was still a French colony and the abolition of slavery had occurred less than a century before.

Brought up as one of nine children under the watchful eye of his school teacher father and stay-at-home mother, Manglou enjoyed much freedom exploring the banks of the Saint-Jean river, often going barefoot and shirtless.

From the end of 1960 to 1975, Manglou successively held the position of Director of Social & Cultural Institutions in Sainte-Suzanne, Soisy-sous-Montmorency and Boulogne-Billancourt.

In 1971 he devoted a year of advanced study at the French National Institute of Popular Education at Marly-le-Roi to the study of the development of inter-disciplinary scholarship in rural areas. Manglou's study culminated "Animation and Development," a dissertation that was written in collaboration with Jean Schüler and is considered authoritative in the field.

In 1974–1975, as Director of the Youth Center of Boulogne-Billancourt, Manglou began to coordinate various volunteer organizations in a city of 120,000. The exhibition "Associations in the City", unique for its time, received 10,000 visitors.

During this same period Manglou also obtained a maîtrise in Human Sciences at the University of Paris, Val-de-Marne – a foreshadowing of experienced-based learning, which was later formalized in France as Validation des Acquis de l'Experience.

These various sociological approaches and a thirst for getting to know people and their cultures naturally led Yves Manglou to make his native island the focus of his literary journey.

Manglou is currently Series Editor at Éditions Orphie.

Bibliography
Orphie Editions
 Grand-mère Kalle
 Noir mais Marron (Black but Brown, in reference to the name wearing by the free slaves)
 Kaloubadia Madam Debassayns (in Créole Réunionnais)

Black Phaeton Editions
 Le mystère du Piton de La Fournaise (The Fournaise mystery)
 Zépingue le Petit Tangue (in collaboration with Josette Manglou and Yves Llopiz)
 La naissance de Ticlou (in collaboration with Josette Manglou and Yves Llopiz)

References

These are French articles related to Yves Manglou:
 Yves Manglou, « La tendance à tourner le dos à la mer s’inverse », Le JIR, 2 December 2007.
 « Yves Manglou, romancier et aventurier de la mer », Le JIR, 6 August 2006.
 « La Famille Manglou, l'âme créole », L'Express, 5 April 2004.
 « Le quotidien de la mer : l'écrivain Yves Manglou », émission RFI, 17 April 2006.

External links
 Site de l'Association des Enseignants Documentalistes de l'Education Nationale de la Réunion.

Writers from Réunion
French publishers (people)
Living people
1943 births
French male writers
21st-century French male writers